The Control of Supplies Act 1961, is a Malaysian laws which enacted to provide for the control and rationing of supplies.

Structure
The Control of Supplies Act 1961, in its current form (1 December 2011), consists of 4 Parts containing 30 sections and 1 schedule (including 7 amendments).
 Part I: Preliminary
 Part II: Powers of Controller
 Part III: Offences and Penalties
 Part IV: Miscellaneous and Repeal
 Schedule

References

External links
 Control of Supplies Act 1961 

1961 in Malayan law
Malaysian federal legislation